Bahçeli is a belde (town) in Niğde Province, Turkey.

Geography 
Bahçeli is a part of Bor district of Niğde Province. At  it is very close to Kemerhisar, another town in Niğde Province. The population of the town is 2316 as of 2011

History 

According to radiocarbon dating (14C) in Köşkhöyük tumulus within Bahçeli   earliest settlement in Bahçeli may be as old as 5000 BC. The nearby town Kemerhisar was a major settlement named Tyana in ancient ages and Bahçeli was a part of Tyana. The most important relic from the Roman Empire domination is a big Roman bath. After the Roman period, the settlement lost its former glory. It was a village during the Medieval ages. After 1954, it was declared township.

Economy 
The town economy depends on the orchards around the town. Main product is apple. Other fruits such as cherries, grapes and apricots are also produced.

References 

Towns in Turkey
Populated places in Niğde Province
Bor District, Niğde